Poparić is a surname. Notable people with this surname include:

Frane Poparić (born 1959), a Croatian footballer
Milan Poparić (born 1978), a Bosnia and Herzegovina criminal

Croatian surnames
Serbian surnames